Srednyaya Usva is a rural locality (a settlement) in Gornozavodsky District, Perm Krai, Russia. The population was 499 as of 2010. There are 14  streets.

Geography 
Srednyaya Usva is located 117 km northeast of Gornozavodsk (the district's administrative centre) by road. Medvedka is the nearest rural locality.

References 

Rural localities in Gornozavodsky District